Donald Applecore is a 1952 American animated short film directed by Jack Hannah and produced by Walt Disney. In the short film, Donald Duck is an apple farmer trying to save his crop from Chip and Dale.

Plot
Donald Duck, the apple farmer notices his apples have been nibbled on into applecores and catches Chip 'n' Dale in the act when he sees them dumping them in his basket. He captures them & demands apples that aren't eaten. They convince him that they have more better apples, & persuade him to follow them but when he reaches their home, he instead gets more applecores & receives a nasty bite that causes him to fall while Chip & Dale also drop his basket. Seeing them load uneaten apples like a conveyor belt, he tries to detour their paths, but they always get the apples back on track by copying him & he once again falls out while trying to ram them. He results in having to use force, by acquiring his helicopter from the barn, & going to his lab to fill it with insect powder. By means of a shooter/sprayer at the back, he covers the entire apple field with the powder, & waits until the area is clear. But when he checks if they are dead, he sees that they have somehow donned tiny gas masks & they continue to eat the apples & by means of a running gag throughout the film that involves one person saying "Applecore" the other then saying "Baltimore", then the other person asking the other "who's your friend?" & the person that the other mentions is bombarded with applecores, when Donald says his "friend" is himself, the chipmunks bombard him & cause him to fall off his helicopter. Donald then proceeds to steal their supply by using the helicopter's back propeller to cut a hole in the tree & then putting them in his helicopter. When the chipmunks notice all their apples are gone, Donald then plays the same applecore bombarding gag on Dale which results in Chip getting bombarding after Dale says Chip's his friend, & in anger, Chip throws an apple on Dale. Donald then stores all their apples in his silo. The chipmunks then try to get the apples without causing a flood of apples to come down on them. However, Dale sets it off & they are covered in apples along with Donald, who was standing on top of the silo. After he gets bombarded by the last apple in the silo, he finally snaps & goes & combines the insect powder with his other potions, including poison, atomic dust, essence of TNT, lye, acid, nide, arse, to create a super deadly atomic mixture, then finally adds atomic pills into the mixture to make the potion powerful & to use as artillery. Chip & Dale then use the advantage to steal all of Donald's apples during then. By the time they are finished, Donald arrives & bombards them with the atomic pellets, destroying the silo & a haystack (revealing a needle in the ash) in the process. In the ensuing chase, a pill accidentally enters the chicken coop, where one of his hens eats it, causing it to instantly laying an egg time bomb that explodes while Donald is holding it & as he realizes the situation too late, creating a hole that sends him all the way to China. While he & a Chinese squabble, the chipmunks then drop all the already eaten applecores down the hole causing the applecore gag to play out again, as after the gag with Donald once again claiming his "friend" to be himself, is heard being hit by a gong as Chip & Dale celebrate their victory.

Voice cast
 Clarence Nash as Donald Duck
 Jimmy MacDonald as Chip
 Dessie Flynn as Dale

Television
 Walt Disney Presents, episode #5.20: "The Adventures of Chip 'n' Dale"
 The New Mickey Mouse Club, episode C-003, January 19, 1977
 Good Morning, Mickey, episode #5
 Mickey's Mouse Tracks, episode #12
 Donald's Quack Attack, episode #3
 The Ink and Paint Club, episode #1.48: "The Return of Chip 'n' Dale"

Home media
The short was released on November 11, 2008, on Walt Disney Treasures: The Chronological Donald, Volume Four: 1951-1961.

Additional releases include:
 Mickey Mouse and Donald Duck Cartoon Collections, Volume 2 (VHS)
 The Adventures of Chip 'n' Dale (VHS)
 Walt Disney Cartoon Classics: Starring Chip 'n' Dale (VHS)
 Walt Disney Cartoon Classics: Starring Mickey & Minnie / Starring Chip 'n' Dale (LaserDisc)
 Melody Time (DVD)
 Chip 'n' Dale Volume 2: Trouble in a Tree (DVD)

Notes
Footage of this cartoon is shown in a film about the making of Donald Duck Orange Juice, except that the apples are recolored orange to look like oranges.

External links 
 
 Donald Applecore at The Internet Animation Database
 Donald Applecore on Filmaffinity

References

Donald Duck short films
Films produced by Walt Disney
1950s Disney animated short films
Films directed by Jack Hannah
1952 animated films
1952 films
1950s English-language films
Chip 'n' Dale films